Philip H. Winne is a professor of educational psychology and former Canada Research Chair in Self-Regulated Learning and Learning Technologies at Simon Fraser University. A Fellow of the American Educational Research Association, the American Psychological Association, the Association for Psychological Science, and the Canadian Psychological Association, Winne has made significant contributions to research on self-regulated learning. He is the principal investigator of the Learning Kit Project, which has developed educational software, now called nStudy, founded on principles of self-regulated learning.

Before earning a PhD from Stanford University in 1976, Winne received undergraduate and master's degrees from Bucknell University. He has served as President of the Canadian Educational Researchers Association (1984-1986), the Canadian Association for Educational Psychology (1988-1990), and Division 15-Educational Psychology of the American Psychological Association (2001-2003). He co-edited the Educational Psychologist and serves as associate editor of the British Journal of Educational Psychology. Winne has authored (or co-authored) over 100 peer-reviewed journal articles, over 60 book chapters, and 5 books including an introductory textbook on educational psychology that is widely used in Canada (Woolfolk, Winne, & Perry, 2006).

References

External links
Research Profile

Educational psychologists
Canada Research Chairs
Living people
Year of birth missing (living people)
Educational Psychologist (journal) editors